JRU may refer to:

Jharkhand Rai University, India
José Rizal University, Philippines

See also
Jru' language, language in Laos
Jrue, given name